Bijuesca is a municipality located in the province of Zaragoza, Aragon, Spain. According to the 2018 census (INE), the municipality has a population of 98 inhabitants.

References

External links
 

Municipalities in the Province of Zaragoza